Elections were held in the state of Western Australia on 7 April 1956 to elect all 50 members to the Legislative Assembly. The Labor Party, led by Premier Albert Hawke, won a second term in office against the Liberal-Country coalition, led by Sir Ross McLarty.

Key dates

Results

|}

 342,018 electors were enrolled to vote at the election, but 16 seats (32% of the total) were uncontested—5 Labor seats (seven less than 1953) representing 24,951 enrolled voters, 5 Liberal seats (two more than 1953) representing 24,834 enrolled voters, and 6 Country seats (one less than 1953) representing 29,839 enrolled voters.

See also
 Members of the Western Australian Legislative Assembly, 1953–1956
 Members of the Western Australian Legislative Assembly, 1956–1959
 Candidates of the 1956 Western Australian state election

References

Elections in Western Australia
1956 elections in Australia
1950s in Western Australia
April 1956 events in Australia